June Dayton (born Mary June Wetzel; August 24, 1923 – June 13, 1994) was an American television actress who appeared in a variety of shows from the 1950s into the 1980s.

Early life 
Dayton was born in Dayton, Ohio. She used her hometown of Dayton to create a professional name. Her introduction to acting came via a dramatic arts course in college.

Stage
Dayton's Broadway credits include The Ivy Green (1949), Tenting Tonight (1947) and Lovely Me (1946).

She worked in summer stock theater for several years, and in 1951, she toured in Australia with a production of The Moon Is Blue.

Television 
Dayton played Mary Aldrich in The Aldrich Family, Patsy Hamilton in The Brighter Day, Jennifer in A Date with Life, Grace Baden in Lucas Tanner, and Lucy Spaulding in Paradise Bay.

Dayton appeared as a guest star in episodes of Studio One, Robert Montgomery Presents, Kraft Theatre, Gunsmoke (“Laughing Gas” - 1958 - S3E29 & “Bently” - 1964 - S9E28), The Investigators, The Fugitive, The F.B.I., Barnaby Jones, and Quincy, M.E.. She made five guest appearances on Perry Mason, twice as the defendant: in 1957 she played Myrna Davenport in "The Case of the Runaway Corpse", and in 1958, she played Sue Hardisty in "The Case of the Buried Clock". Dayton played Catherine Driscoll in the episode "The Party Line" on CBS's Dennis the Menace.  She had a memorable role as Helen Turner in The Twilight Zone episode "A Penny for Your Thoughts", which featured Dick York. She appeared in an episode of Armstrong Circle Theatre titled "Divorcees Anonymous".

In 1965, Dayton was cast as Virginia Farragut in  "The Battle of San Francisco Bay" in the syndicated anthology series, Death Valley Days. She also starred in a 1969 episode of Land of the Giants titled "Home Sweet Home".

Dayton guest-starred in two episodes of Cannon: the September 1971 episode of "Death Chain" as Susan Kendrix and the February 1974 episode "Blood Money" as Nurse Laura Meader. 

She made three appearances on Barnaby Jones: the January 1974 episode "The Platinum Connection" as Mrs. Andrews, the October 1974 episode "Odd Man Loses" as Pam Hogan and the March 1979 episode "Child of Love Child of Vengeance: Part 1" as Marie Adams." 

Her film appearances included roles in Twilight of Honor (1963), One Man's Way (1963), Tora! Tora! Tora! (1970), Something for Joey (1977), Deadman's Curve (1978) and The Other Side of the Mountain Part 2 (1978).  Dayton was in an episode of The Dick Van Dyke Show about an ex army buddy who Rob thought is a jewel thief.

Personal life 
Dayton married actor Dean Harens in 1947.  The marriage lasted until her death in 1994.

Death
Dayton died of cancer in Sherman Oaks, California. She was 70.

Filmography

References

External links 

 
 

1923 births
1994 deaths
Actresses from Ohio
20th-century American actresses
American film actresses
American stage actresses
American television actresses